Chunchura Assembly constituency is an assembly constituency in Hooghly district in the Indian state of West Bengal.

Overview
As per orders of the Delimitation Commission, No. 190 Chunchura Assembly constituency is composed of the following: Hooghly Chinsurah Municipality and Bandel, Debanandapur, Kodalia I and Kodalia II gram panchayats of Chinsurah Mogra community development block and Polba, Rajhat and Sugandha gram panchayats of Polba Dadpur community development block.

Chunchura Assembly constituency is part of No. 28 Hooghly (Lok Sabha constituency).

Members of Legislative Assembly

Election results

2021

2011
In the 2011 election, Asit Mazumdar of Trinamool Congress defeated his nearest rival Narendranath Dey of AIFB.

 
  

 
  

.# Swing calculated on Congress+Trinamool Congress vote percentages taken together in 2006.

1977-2006
In the 2006, 2001, 1996, 1991 and 1987 state assembly elections Naren Dey Forward Bloc won the Chinsurah assembly seat defeating his nearest rivals Ashis Sen of Trinamool Congress in 2006, Robin Mukherjee of Trinamool Congress in 2001, Tapan Dasgupta of Congress in 1996 and 1991, and Chandra Kumar Dey of Congress in 1987. Sambhu Charan Ghosh of Forward Bloc defeated Rabin Mukherjee of Congress in 1982 and Chandra Kumar Dey of Congress in 1977.

1951-1972
Bhupati Majumdar of Congress won in 1972 and 1971. Sambhu Charan Ghosh of Forward Bloc won in 1969, 1967 and 1962. Bhupati Majumdar of Congress won in 1957. In independent India's first election in 1951 Jyotish Chandra Ghosh of Forward Bloc (MG) and Radha Nath Das of Congress won the Chinsurah double seat.

References

Assembly constituencies of West Bengal
Politics of Hooghly district